The Hanover House (re-released digitally as The Calling in 2022) is a 2014 horror film that was directed by Corey Norman and is his feature-film directorial debut. The film had its world premiere on May 9, 2014 at the Saco Drive-In. It stars Brian Chamberlain as a man that must deal with the demons from his past before he can move on as an adult.

Synopsis
Robert Foster (Brian Chamberlain) is returning from his father's funeral when he ends up hitting a young girl with his car. Horrified, he quickly goes to the closest farmhouse in hopes of getting medical help for the girl, only for his deceased father to answer the door. There Robert must face the demons of his past before he can finally move on.

Cast
Brian Chamberlain as Robert Foster
Casey Turner as Shannon Foster
Anne Bobby as Martha Hobson
Olivia Roy as Katie Blake
Daniel Noel as Jim Foster
David J. Shaffer as Uncle Fred
Erik Moody as Charlie Foster
Shannon Campbell as Ellie Hobson
Matthew Delamater as John Blake
Jenny Anastasoff as Patience Blake
Ian Carlsen as The Priest
Rick Dalton as The Preacher
Vanessa Romanoff as Sarah Hall
Andrew Sawyer as Adam Hall
Lisa Boucher Hartman as Helena Reese
Mike Rodway as Young Jim Foster

Production
Filming took place in Maine during December 2012 at various locations, including a farm house that the cast later claimed was haunted. The initial principal photography was funded through a successful Kickstarter campaign and a second fundraiser through Indiegogo was held to raise funding to complete the movie.  While filming, Norman was inspired by director and United States fugitive Roman Polanski and Austrian neurologist Sigmund Freud and tried to show these influences in the movie.

Reception
Bloody Disgusting gave the movie a mixed review, stating that they enjoyed the acting and that the film was well crafted, but that it "tromps around the depressing murk a bit too much for [their] tastes".

Horror Hound gave the film a very positive review, stating "The Hanover House is one of the best independent horror films I have ever seen."

Awards

Best Feature Film, Sanford International Film Festival (2014)

Best Feature Film, HorrorHound Weekend Film Festival (2014)

Best Director – Corey Norman, HorrorQuest Film Festival (2014)

Best Actor – Brian Chamberlain, HorrorQuest Film Festival (2014)

Best Maine Film, Sanford International Film Festival (2014)

Runner Up, Best Supernatural Film, Fright Night Film Festival (2014)

References

External links
 
 

2014 films
2014 horror films
Films shot in Maine
2010s English-language films